István Sándorfi (In France Étienne Sandorfi, 12 June 1948 in Budapest, Hungary, – 26 December 2007 in Paris, France) was a Hungarian hyperrealist painter.

Istvan (known as Etienne) Sandorfi was born in Budapest in 1948 and died in 2007. His father was director of the American company, IBM, in Hungary. Because of this association he served five years in Stalinist prisons during the Communist regime and his family was deported to an isolated Hungarian village. At the time of the 1956 uprising the Sandorfi family fled the country and became expatriates, first in Germany, then in France. Greatly affected by the violence of the revolution and by the aberration of political systems in general, Istvan took refuge in drawing, and then, at the age of 12, in oil painting.

Art became his overriding passion to the detriment of his schooling. At the age of 17, while still in secondary school, Sandorfi had his first individual exhibition at a small gallery in Paris. After his second exhibition, in 1966, he gave up drawing to devote himself exclusively to painting.

In view of the morbid nature of his son's paintings and their lack of commercial success, Sandorfi's father enrolled Istvan at the School of Fine Arts, where he was to gain a degree, and at the School of Decorative Arts.

This, the family thought, would give him a more prestigious status than that of mere "artist". Gradually he achieved financial independence by accepting, along with the occasional sale of paintings, portrait commissions and few advertising illustrations. In 1973 Sandorfi had his first significant exhibition, at the Museum of Modern Art in Paris. Exhibitions were to follow in France, Germany, Belgium and finally the United States.

For about fifteen years he painted a series of large-scale self-portraits, sometimes told to be aggressive and theatrical in character, which gave him an ambiguous reputation with the public. It was written that he 'painted like an assassin'. From 1988 onwards the artist abandoned his disturbing images and began to concentrate and further elaborate on his technique.

Preferring exclusive contracts, less for financial reasons than to avoid the administrative aspects of his career and a professional milieu with which he couldn't identify, Sandorfi worked with the Beaubourg Gallery from 1974 to 1976, and then for seven years with the Isy Brachot Gallery. From 1984 to 1988 his work was exhibited in various galleries by an interesting patron and collector and then handled by the Prazan-Fitoussi Gallery from 1990 to 1993.

From 1994 to 2001, his paintings have been represented by the Jane Kahan Gallery in New York. Visceral and self-taught in work as in life, Sandorfi has since childhood distrusted 'things learned' and has remained true to his personal convictions. He prefers to paint at night, but each day goes to bed later than the day before, thus living in a perpetual time lag, which sidelines him from any social life. Sandorfi reconciles this isolation with his family circle (he is the father of two girls, Ange and Eve) and his emotional life, thereby maintaining a delicate and studied balance between his life and his work.

Exhibitions

1966 - Galerie des Jeunes, Paris • Galerie de la Barbière, Le Barroux
1970 - Galerie 3+2, Paris
1973 - Musée d'Art Moderne de la Ville de Paris
1974 - Galerie Daniel Gervis, Paris
1975 - Galerie Beaubourg, Paris
1976 - Bucholz Galerie, Munich
1977, 1980 - Galerie Isy Brachot, Brussels
1978, 1981, 1983 - Galerie Isy Brachot, Paris
1979 - FIAC, Galerie Isy Brachot, Paris
1981 - Galerie Isy Brachot, Basel
1982 - Amaury Taitinger Gallery, New York City
1984 - FIAC, Galerie Isy Brachot, Paris
1986 - Galerie Lavignes-Bastille, Paris - Galerie de Bellecour, Lyon
1987 - Lavignes-Bastille Gallery, Los Angeles - Hôtel de Ville, Nancy
1988 - Armory Show '88, Lavignes-Bastille Gallery, New York - Abbaye des Cordeliers, Châteauroux (retrospektív) - Louis K. Meisel Gallery, New York City - FIAC, Galerie Lavignes-Bastille, Paris
1991 - Galerie Prazan-Fitussi, Paris
1993 - Galerie Guénéguaud, Paris - Galerie Mann, Paris
1994, 1997 - Jane Kahan Gallery, New York City – Art Miami, Jane Kahan Gallery
1997 – Seattle Art Fair, Jane Kahan Gallery
1999 - Galerie Tempera, Brussels
1999-2000 - Gallerihuset, Copenhagen – The International 20th Century Arts Fair New York, Jane Kahan Gallery
2002 – Art Palm Beach, Jane Kahan Gallery
2006 - Erdész-Maklári Galéria, Budapest
2007 - A test színeváltozása. Életműkiállítás, MODEM, Debrecen - Los Angeles Art Show, Jane Kahan Gallery
2008 - Moscow World Fine Art Fair, Jane Kahan Gallery
2008 - Haughton Art and Design Fair New York, Jane Kahan Gallery
2009, 2010 - Los Angeles Art Show, Jane Kahan Gallery
2010, 2011 - Haughton Art Antiques London, Jane Kahan Gallery
2010 - Haughton International Fine Art & Antiques Dealers Show, Jane Kahan Gallery
2016 - #MEAM - Barcelona
2029 - #Hokimuseum in Japan.

References

External links

 https://istvansandorfi.com

 Artportál: Sándorfi István 
 Fans of Sándorfi's Art
 Some of his painting
 His paintings
 Sándorfi István died
 https://web.archive.org/web/20160304035157/http://cenegal.hu/index.php?option=com_content&view=article&id=83:in-memoriam-sandorfi-istvan&catid=32:hirek-kozlemenyek&Itemid=323&lang=hu
 Sandorfi at Jane Kahan Gallery

1948 births
2007 deaths
Hungarian painters
Artists from Budapest
Modern painters